Door Chalen is a Bollywood drama film, directed by Phani Majumdar and starring Naseem Banu and Balraj Sahni. It was released in 1946.

Cast
 Balraj Sahni
 Naseem Banu

References

External links
 

1946 films
1940s Hindi-language films
Indian black-and-white films